Tauras military district (also Tauras partisans military district) is a military district of Lithuanian partisans which operated in 1945–1951 in the Suvalkija ethnographic region – counties of Marijampolė, Šakiai, Vilkaviškis and in the left bank of the Nemunas river in counties of Alytus and Kaunas. One of the most important partisan districts. It is named after aurochs - tauras in Lithuanian.

Leaders

Structure of Lithuanian partisans' organisation

References

External links
Genocide and Resistance Research Centre of Lithuania
The partisan military districts of the Lithuanian freedom fighters
Vienui Vieni ("Utterly Alone") 2004 film about the Lithuanian Forest Brothers, based on the real life events of Juozas Lukša aka Juozas L. Daumantas
War Chronicle of the Partisans – Chronicle of Lithuanian partisans, June 1944 – May 1949, prepared by Algis Rupainis
Forest Brothers – Fight for the Baltics – official YouTube channel of NATO, 2017

Military districts of Lithuanian partisans
 
Guerrilla organizations